Gonomomera is a genus of moths belonging to the subfamily Olethreutinae of the family Tortricidae.

Species
Gonomomera halixanta (Meyrick, 1910)

See also
List of Tortricidae genera

References

External links
tortricidae.com

Tortricidae genera
Olethreutinae
Taxa named by Alexey Diakonoff